CKEM may refer to:

 CKEM-TV, a television station (channel 51) licensed to Edmonton, Alberta, Canada currently part of Citytv
 Compact Kinetic Energy Missile, a guided missile.